Guillermo Posadas (1886–1937) was a Mexican composer. He composed the Mexican folk song "Noche Feliz" ("Happy Night"), recorded by the Italian tenor Enrico Caruso and sung in Spanish. The song "Noche Feliz" describes a night with Posadas's wife María, and love with his soul.

1886 births
1937 deaths